Wausaukee is a village in Marinette County, Wisconsin, in the United States. The population was 575 at the 2010 census. The village is part of the Marinette, WI–MI Micropolitan Statistical Area.

History
Wausaukee is a Menominee word that means “river in the hills.” The town was started in 1863 by John S. Monroe, who bought 160 acres of land from business tycoon Lars Kovala and built a mill to supply the railroads with lumber for bridges and culverts. His first building was a log cabin home that was also used to board the mill workers. As the town grew and more settlers moved in, his log cabin grew into an inn that was the only public eating establishment north of Green Bay.

On August 19, 2011 at 4:45pm, an EF1 tornado struck Wausaukee. One fatality was recorded.

Geography
Wausaukee is located at  (45.3767, -87.9561).

The Wausaukee River flows through the village into the Menominee River.

Demographics

2010 census
As of the census of 2010, there were 575 people, 275 households, and 145 families living in the village. The racial makeup of the village was 95.7% White, 1.2% Native American, 0.2% Asian, 0.5% from other races, and 2.4% from two or more races. Hispanic or Latino of any race were 2.8% of the population.

There were 275 households, of which 25.8% had children under the age of 18 living with them, 33.5% were married couples living together, 12.7% had a female householder with no husband present, 6.5% had a male householder with no wife present, and 47.3% were non-families. 41.8% of all households were made up of individuals, and 24% had someone living alone who was 65 years of age or older. The average household size was 2.09 and the average family size was 2.78.

The median age in the village was 43.3 years. 22.8% of residents were under the age of 18; 7.8% were between the ages of 18 and 24; 21.6% were from 25 to 44; 25.2% were from 45 to 64, and 22.4% were 65 years of age or older. The gender makeup of the village was 48.7% male and 51.3% female.

2000 census
As of the census of 2000, there were 572 people, 251 households, and 150 families living in the village. The racial makeup of the village was 96.50% White, 0.87% Black or African American, 22.22% Native American, 0.17% from other races, and 1.22% from two or more races. 0.87% of the population were Hispanic or Latino of any race.

There were 251 households, out of which 28.7% had children under the age of 18 living with them, 43.0% were married couples living together, 13.5% had a female householder with no husband present, and 40.2% were non-families. 35.9% of all households were made up of individuals, and 20.3% had someone living alone who was 65 years of age or older. The average household size was 2.27 and the average family size was 2.97.

In the village, the population was spread out, with 26.2% under the age of 18, 7.2% from 18 to 24, 22.9% from 25 to 44, 21.9% from 45 to 64, and 21.9% who were 65 years of age or older. The median age was 40 years. For every 100 females, there were 84.5 males. For every 100 females age 18 and over, there were 75.8 males.

The median income for a household in the village was $25,313, and the median income for a family was $35,833. Males had a median income of $30,313 versus $20,417 for females. The per capita income for the village was $13,098. About 17.5% of families and 23.0% of the population were below the poverty line, including 36.8% of those under age 18 and 11.3% of those age 65 or over.

Notable people
 Harlan P. Bird, Wisconsin State Senator
 Lyle Mays, jazz pianist and composer with the Pat Metheny Group, was born in Wausaukee.
 Zachary A. Vane, Washington State Legislator and businessman
 Trixie Mattel, drag performer, musician, and comedian, winner of RuPaul's Drag Race All Stars 3

Images

References

External links

 Wausaukee (Town & Village), Wisconsin website
 Sanborn fire insurance map: 1911

Villages in Marinette County, Wisconsin
Villages in Wisconsin
Marinette micropolitan area